Servis Tyres is a Pakistani tire and tube manufacturer based in Gujrat city and Muridke, Pakistan.

Company background
Servis Industries Limited was founded by three college friends Chaudhry Nazar Mohammad and Chaudhry Mohammad Hussain from Gujrat city, British India. Chaudhry Mohammad Said from Gujranwala district also joined the two other college friends to found the company back in 1941. They started the business on a modest scale and first started producing handbags and some sports goods. Encouraged by the initial success, they launched a shoe manufacturing plant in Lahore in 1954 which was later shifted to Gujrat. Then the company started producing tyres, tubes and technical rubber products besides selling footwear.

Servis Tyres was founded in 1970 with its head-office located in Gulberg, Lahore. It is the second-oldest company of the Servis Industries Limited after Servis Shoes. Company is registered with the United Kingdom Accreditation Service (UKAS) and Lloyd's Register Quality Assurance (LRQA).

Best vendor performance
In 2012, Servis Tyres was awarded the Best Vendor Performance Award 2012 by the Atlas Honda in a ceremony held on November 3, 2012. Award was presented by the senior managing director of Honda Motor Company, Japan. This award acknowledges outstanding quality, value, service, innovation, delivery, organizational health, supply chain management, diversity, technology, environmental practices and price of Servis Tyres.

As of 2012, Servis Industries Limited claims that it is the largest exporter of footwear for Pakistan in footwear and the largest manufacturer of tyres and tubes for motorcycles and bikes in Pakistan for the past 10 years.

References

External links 
  of Servis Tyres

Tyres
Pakistani companies established in 1970
Manufacturing companies based in Lahore
Automotive companies established in 1970
Tyre manufacturers of Pakistan
Pakistani brands
Privately held companies of Pakistan